is a Japanese manga series created by Clamp. Appearing as a serial in the manga magazine Nakayoshi from the November 1993 issue to the February 1995 issue, the chapters of Magic Knight Rayearth were collected into three bound volumes by Kodansha, and were published from July 1994 to March 1995. A sequel was serialized in the same manga magazine from the March 1995 issue to the April 1996 issue, and was published by Kodansha in three bound volumes from July 1995 to April 1996. The series follows three eighth-grade girls who find themselves transported from modern-day Japan into a magical world, where they are tasked with rescuing a princess.

Rayearth combines elements from the magical girl and mecha anime genres with parallel world fantasy. The manga was adapted into two anime series in 1994 and an original video animation (OVA) in 1997.

Plot

Magic Knight Rayearth focuses on three eighth-grade girls: the tomboyish, headstrong but short ; the quick-tempered and no-nonsense only child ; and the intelligent and ladylike . While on a field trip to the Tokyo Tower with their respective schools, the girls find themselves drawn into another world, Cephiro. There they learn that Cephiro is influenced by one's will and that the Pillar maintains Cephiro through prayer. The girls are then tasked with rescuing the current Pillar, Princess Emeraude, from her abductor, the high priest and antagonist Zagato, after which they will be returned to Tokyo.

Guided by the creature Mokona on their quest, the girls discover their respective element-based magic and awaken the three , creatures who can take the form of giant robots that the girls must pilot. As the girls progress on their journey, they overcome their differences, learning how to work together and accept each other as friends. After the girls find Zagato, they fight and are able to destroy him. After this, they finally reach where Emeraude is imprisoned, but the three learn that she had fallen in love with Zagato, which had hindered her ability to pray solely for Cephiro's well-being. Feeling responsible for her actions, she had imprisoned herself, and eventually summoned the Magic Knights to kill her, as no one from Cephiro could harm the Pillar. Her dark side then takes over, seeking to destroy the Magic Knights for killing her love. After a short defensive fight against Princess Emeraude, the Magic Knights have no choice but to kill her. They then find themselves transported back to Tokyo.

The second part of the series deals with the complications caused by Princess Emeraude's death. Set a year later, it opens with the three protagonists struggling with their guilt and despair over their role in her death. Meeting again at Tokyo Tower, they find themselves transported mysteriously to Cephiro again, and discover that only a single piece of Cephiro remains, which holds a castle where the survivors gather to take refuge. With the Pillar gone, Cephiro is, for the most part, defenseless, and the girls are saddened to learn that a new Pillar must be chosen by the Pillar system before the whole planet is destroyed. Not only that, three warring planets have begun their attempts to conquer the Pillar-less Cephiro: Autozam, a technologically advanced world which intends to use the Pillar system to remove the pollution in its air; Fahren, whose childish ruler Lady Aska plans to use it to turn Cephiro into a world of her whims; and Chizeta, an overpopulated world whose sibling rulers Tatra and Tarta plan to use it to make Cephiro into a colony.

As the Magic Knights help defend the castle, they each agree that the fate of the planet should not be the responsibility of only one person which, like Princess Emeraude, effectively prevents that person from ever being able to live and love freely. What's more, there is a mostly unspoken risk that when a new Pillar is chosen, something may eventually hinder them from praying solely for Cephiro's well-being, cause them to summon new Magic Knights to kill them, and bring Cephiro to near-destruction again until a new Pillar is chosen, causing the cycle of events to continue endlessly. As such, Lantis, a powerful magic swordsman and Zagato's younger brother, wishes to end the Pillar system for those reasons.

Eventually, Mokona narrows the candidates down to two: Hikaru and the sickly Eagle Vision of Autozam, who is friends with Lantis and, as such, wishes to end the Pillar system for him with his eternal sleep. As the two undergo the test to become the new Pillar in a recreation of Tokyo, Mokona reveals itself to be the creator of Cephiro and its laws, both of which it had created after sadly witnessing the violence and destructive nature of the people on its earlier creation, Earth. It was responsible for bringing the three girls back to Cephiro. In the end, Hikaru becomes the new Pillar of Cephiro, and brings Eagle Vision back to Cephiro from the Tokyo recreation with the help of Fuu and Umi, against Mokona's insistence that only one may return. Hikaru then rejects the Pillar system, decreeing once and for all the fate of the planet should not be the responsibility of one person. Mokona accepts their decision and leaves with the three Mashin. The manga concludes with the three girls' returning to a new Cephiro to visit their loved ones, as they work with the rulers of the other planets to solve their planets' problems, and contemplate Mokona's wish to allow the three protagonists to bring change to Cephiro.

Differences in the anime adaptation
The first season remains mostly faithful to the first arc of the manga aside from the inclusion of the original character Inouva and a multitude of subplots, but the second season shows a rapid departure. Most notable differences are the creation of two anime-only antagonists, Nova and Lady Debonair, who were born from the intense despair of Hikaru and the people of Cephiro respectively after the death of Princess Emeraude. It is also revealed by the Rune Gods that the girls were summoned back to Cephiro by their own will, most notably Hikaru's as her strength of heart also allowed her to become the new Pillar, a position she rejects in a similar fashion to the manga.

Development
During the celebration of the publication of the Soryuden novels, which Clamp had illustrated, the group was asked by Hideki Yamaguchi, editor for the Japanese shōjo (targeted towards girls) manga magazine Nakayoshi, to do a series for the magazine. The editor-in-chief wanted a story that could appeal to elementary readers and older, while Clamp wished to bring in younger fans. Without direction from the editors, the group decided on a series combining robots, as they were fond of robot anime; role-playing games (RPGs), which saw popularity in Japan at the time; and fantasy, to counterbalance the robots, which they thought alone would be off-putting to their target audience. According to Ohkawa, the magazine's success with the magical girl manga Sailor Moon (1991–97) made it possible for the group to pitch a serial with robots to its editors.

A friend of Clamp, illustrator Takeshi Okazaki, created the "Rayearth" part of the title, while Ohkawa thought of the rest. At that point, Clamp had completed a "basic" idea of the plot. For the names of the characters, they drew on car names, feeling that they would be interesting and memorable for children, who might otherwise have difficulty learning the names of characters in katakana. The inclusion of giant robots gave the artists some difficulty, as the massive scale of the robots made it impossible to depict the characters and robots in the same frame. The artists also omitted the cockpit of the robots, to show their faces instead. Greatly anticipating the ending to the first part of the series, Clamp found the protagonists' initial adventures in Cephiro "really easy" to create. Ohkawa noted that, had their target audience been older or male, they would have considered stopping the series with the conclusion of part one. The second part, however, proved difficult for the group to create, as they felt as if they had "written [them]selves into a corner".

Magic Knight Rayearth explores "fate, grim destiny, and sacrifice," as do many of Clamp's works. According to Ohkawa, who believes in choosing one's fate, humanity's fate is caused by one's actions; Cephiro is merely an exaggeration of Earth.

Media

Manga
Written and illustrated by Clamp, Magic Knight Rayearth appeared as a serial in the Japanese magazine Nakayoshi from November 1993 to February 1995. Kodansha collected the chapters in three tankōbon volumes. The first was published on July 22, 1994; the last was released on March 6, 1995. The sequel also appeared in Nakayoshi from March 1995 to April 1996.

In 1997, Tokyopop licensed Magic Knight Rayearth for an English-language translation in North America, and serialized it in its manga magazine MixxZine. The English version of the manga was at first issued in a flipped left to right format, but was re-released in the original right to left format in later editions. The English version of the manga also at first continued the volume numbering through the two series, such that Magic Knight Rayearth II volumes #1-3 were numbered as volumes "#4-6" (i.e., the 2000/2001 release of Magic Knight Rayearth volume 4 has the same content as the 2003/2004 re-release's Magic Knight Rayearth II volume 1).

It would appear that Tokyopop has lost their license for the series, as Dark Horse Comics announced at their San Diego Comic-Con International 2009 panel that they would be publishing the series in a new omnibus edition in honor of Clamp's 20th anniversary. Dark Horse published the omnibus editions from July 6, 2011 to April 12, 2012.

After Dark Horse Comics' license expired, Kodansha Comics licensed it and began releasing the series in 2 hardcover box sets containing 3 volumes each in honor of the manga's 25th anniversary in 2019. At Anime NYC 2022, Kodansha USA announced that they will release a paperback edition for Fall 2023.

The series is also licensed in French by Pika Édition.

Magic Knight Rayearth

Magic Knight Rayearth II

Anime

The anime series aired first on Japan's Yomiuri TV and on NNS in Tokyo on October 17, 1994, and ended on November 27, 1995. It was directed by Toshihiro Hirano and co-produced by Yomiuri TV and Tokyo Movie Shinsha (now TMS Entertainment). The anime had 2 seasons, lasting 49 episodes altogether. The TV series was licensed in the U.S. twice, first by The Ocean Group and second by Media Blasters and was dubbed by Bang Zoom! Entertainment. The anime series was also aired on the Philippine television network ABS-CBN in 1996, dubbed in Tagalog and airing every Sunday at 9:00 am for the first season and 10:30 am for the second season in 1997. It was popular with Filipino female children and became one of the Philippines' highest-rated anime series of the 20th century, helping to revitalize Filipino interest in anime. It was later aired on GMA Network on November 26, 2001, but on a weekday basis and with a Tagalog dub produced by Telesuccess Productions. It was released on both VHS and DVD. Discotek Media re-released the series on DVD and Blu-ray on January 31, 2017. Anime Limited announced that they had acquired the series for release in the United Kingdom and Ireland.

OVA
A three-part OVA was released in Japan a few years after the end of the manga and the TV series (July 25, September 26, and December 10, 1997). The OVA was named simply Rayearth, and its story was quite different from the original. The characters are all the same, but the relationships, places and events changed radically.

In the OVA, Hikaru, Umi and Fuu are already friends who go to the same school and will soon be leaving for high school. Suddenly, a strange fairy (which turns out to be Mokona, the creature from the original series) appears in front of them. At the same time, strange monsters and wizards start to appear in the city of Tokyo. One of them is Clef, who tries to guide the three girls in order to let them become the Magic Knights, awaken their Mashin and fight against the evil wizards from Cephiro, who are trying to invade the human world. In this version, Ferio, who is a sorcerer under Princess Emeraude's command, is not her brother. Eagle Vision fills that role instead, as well as being the main antagonist after he tricked Zagato to commit suicide in order to bring upon a false balance to Cephiro. His ties to Autozam are non-existent in this version, as he is a citizen of Cephiro from the start. He would put a spell on Emeraude to convince her that Zagato is still alive, so that the sorcerers of Cephiro can continue to exist on Earth as the two worlds would soon merge and each sorcerer would battle against the Magic Knights. Lantis is also introduced right away as being an ally to the Magic Knights and against Eagle's plans. The only other characters that are in the OVA are Ascot and Alcyone, with none of the other characters are featured.

The OVA is licensed in the U.S. by Manga Entertainment, who opted to use a different New York-based voice cast for its English release, which was produced by Skypilot Entertainment.

Theme songs
Opening themes
Three opening themes were used in the series and one in the OVA Rayearth:

Magic Knight Rayearth:
Episodes 01-20:  by Naomi Tamura

Magic Knight Rayearth 2:
Episodes 01-22:  by 
Episodes 23-29:  by Naomi Tamura

Media Blasters' early English DVD release used "Hikari to Kage o Dakishimeta Mama" as the opening for Magic Knight Rayearth 2 episodes 01-22. The original openings from episodes 01-22 were included as an extra on the early DVDs, and was only in Japanese, however this isn't the case with the remastered sets, in which the dubbed openings were removed meaning, all three openings are left intact.

Ending themes
Three ending themes were used:

Magic Knight Rayearth:
Episodes 01-20:  by 

Magic Knight Rayearth 2:
Episodes 01-22:  by 
Episodes 23-29:  by Keiko Yoshinari

Media Blasters' early English DVD release used "Rarabai ~ Yasashiku Dakasete ~" as the ending for Magic Knight Rayearth 2 episodes 23-29. The original ending from episodes 23-29 was included as an extra on the early DVDs, and was only in Japanese, this again was eventually rectified in the remastered sets, in which, like the openings the dubbed endings were removed meaning all three endings were left intact.

In the early English releases of the TV series, Sandy Fox sang both the opening and the ending themes in the English dubbed version.

Rayearth:
 OVA: "All You Need is Love" by Naomi Tamura

Video games

A number of video games have been released that are based on Magic Knight Rayearth. Magic Knight Rayearth, an adventure RPG set in the first TV season, was released for the Sega Saturn. It was the last officially released game for the console in the North America. All other games based on the manga are Japanese-only released, including a Super Famicom role-playing game (RPG), a Sega Pico title called Magic Knight Tanjou, two short RPGs for Game Boy, a raising sim, and another RPG for Sega Game Gear.

The series appears in the Super Robot Wars T game, released in 2019, as well as 2021's Super Robot Wars 30.

Reception
Magic Knight Rayearth has been well received by English-language readers. According to Dark Horse Comics, almost 200,000 copies of the series have been sold in the United States. The first volume of Tokyopop's re-release of Magic Knight Rayearth II placed 44th on the list of the top 100 bestselling graphic novels for February 2004, with an estimated 1,446 copies sold. The first volume of Dark Horse's omnibus edition appeared at the 83rd place of the list of the top 300 bestselling graphic novels for July 2011, with an estimated 1,069 copies sold. The second volume placed 109th on the list for April 2012, with an estimated 942 copies sold.

References
General

Specific

Further reading

External links
 J-pop.com review of OVAs
 Animerica review
 Magic Knight Rayearth at Dark Horse Comics's official website
 
 

 
1993 manga
1994 anime television series debuts
1995 anime television series debuts
1995 manga
1997 anime OVAs
ABS-CBN original programming
Dark fantasy anime and manga
Dark Horse Comics titles
Discotek Media
Isekai anime and manga
Genies in anime and manga
Kodansha manga
Magical girl anime and manga
Mecha anime and manga
Shōjo manga
Sword and sorcery anime and manga
TMS Entertainment
Tokyopop titles
Tomy games
Works by Clamp (manga artists)
Yomiuri Telecasting Corporation original programming